The slaty-backed nightingale-thrush (Catharus fuscater) is a species of bird in the family Turdidae. It is found in Bolivia, Colombia, Costa Rica, Ecuador, Panama, Peru, and Venezuela.

Widespread but shy and difficult to see, this species inhabits dense thickets and understory of subtropical or tropical moist montane forests.

Measuring , the slaty-backed nightingale-thrush has a dark grey back and head, medium grey throat and belly, and light grey belly. These are contrasted by bright orange legs, bill, and eye ring. The iris is light-coloured, which is distinctive amongst similar nightingale-thrushes. The similar sooty thrush is much larger, lacks the whitish belly, and does not overlap the slaty-backed nightingale-thrush's range.

References

External links

 Audio samples of Slaty-backed Nightingale-thrush songs at naturesongs.com
 
 
 
 

slaty-backed nightingale-thrush
Birds of the Talamancan montane forests
Birds of the Northern Andes
slaty-backed nightingale-thrush
Taxonomy articles created by Polbot